Henry Kennedy (born 16 February 1882, date of death unknown) was a Jamaican cricketer. He played in four first-class matches for the Jamaican cricket team from 1905 to 1911.

See also
 List of Jamaican representative cricketers

References

External links
 

1882 births
Year of death missing
Jamaican cricketers
Jamaica cricketers
Cricketers from Kingston, Jamaica